Several Royal Navy ships have borne the name HMS Cherokee:

 was the lead ship of the Cherokee-class of brig-sloops. She saw service during the Napoleonic Wars. In 1810 she participated in an engagement that resulted in her crew qualifying for the Naval General Service Medal. The Navy sold Cherokee in 1828. She then became a merchantman trading between Liverpool and Africa. Chrokee was wrecked in August 1831 returning to England from Africa. 
 was a paddle patrol vessel in service on the Canadian Great Lakes.
 was an Albacore-class wooden screw gunboat.

References

Cherokee